This articles lists events from the year 2023 in Oman.

Incumbents

Events 
 23 February - Oman opens its airspace to Israeli airlines for the first time. Israel's Foreign Minister Eli Cohen calls the decision historic.

Scheduled
 31 October - 2023 Omani general election

References 

 
2020s in Oman
Years of the 21st century in Oman
Oman
Oman